Choiroblemma is a genus of Indian araneomorph spiders in the family Tetrablemmidae that was first described by J. D. Bourne in 1980.  it contains two species, found in India: C. bengalense and C. rhinoxunum.

See also
 List of Tetrablemmidae species

References

Araneomorphae genera
Spiders of the Indian subcontinent
Tetrablemmidae